The Ohio State Highway Patrol is a division of the Ohio Department of Public Safety and has the primary responsibility of traffic enforcement in the state of Ohio.

Divisions
Operationally, the Patrol is divided into units whose varying tasks complement the mission of the Patrol to provide safe roadways throughout the state. Operational units include the Office of Field Operations, units specializing in Aviation, a Special Response Team, Crash reconstruction, Inspections, Mobile Field Force, and Criminal Patrol; Human Resource Management, includes Labor Relations, Career Development and the Administrative Investigation Unit; Office of Investigative Services, includes statewide investigation of crimes occurring on state owned or leased property, crime lab, polygraph services, executive protection for the governor, criminal intelligence and computer crime unit; License and Commercial Standards, which provide for oversight of driver's license and commercial vehicle regulations throughout the state;

The Patrol also has administrative offices which include the Offices of Technology and Communication Services, Finance and Logistics Services, Strategic Services and Recruitment and Training.

The Patrol maintains 55 posts, each administered by one of ten districts and responsible for one, two, or three of Ohio's 88 counties or the Ohio Turnpike. The Berea/Turnpike District operates from four posts on the Ohio Turnpike. Since the turnpike opened in 1955, the Ohio Turnpike Commission has contracted with the Ohio State Highway Patrol to provide law enforcement and assistance to disabled or stranded motorists. They are the only law enforcement agency with jurisdiction on the turnpike.

Enforcement activities
The Patrol divides the duties of road troopers between traffic enforcement and criminal patrol, with emphasis placed on apprehension of criminals using the state's highways, drug interdiction in particular.  Arrests for illegal drugs exceeded 8,400 during the first three quarters of 2017, an increase of 10% over 2016.  Recently the Patrol created a mission statement entitled "LifeStat 1.0", detailing the strategic goals for the Patrol. One of the primary goals of this document was the reduction of traffic crash deaths in Ohio to one per 100 million vehicle miles traveled by the end of 2007; the goal was ambitious: the rate reduced to 1.13 in 2007, 1.10 in 2008.
According to the Patrol, its 1,400 Troopers made over 1.4 million professional stops in 2006, with 60 percent being non-enforcement stops to help, assist or educate motorists. Twenty-five percent of enforcement-related stops in 2006 was for either aggressive driving or for an OVI offense. The Patrol arrested 26,187 drivers for OVI in 2006, and cited 133,650 drivers for aggressive driving.

Organization
Superintendent – Colonel
Assistant Superintendent – Lieutenant Colonel
Assistant Superintendent – Lieutenant Colonel
Administrative Staff
Public Affairs Unit
Office of Personnel – Major
Administrative Investigations Unit
Employee Evaluation & Development
Employee Relations
Staffing Services
Professional Standards Section
Recruitment
Regional Training
Training Academy
Office of Strategic Services – Major
The Hub
Communication Center
Dispatch Operations
Criminal Intel Unit
Finance and Logistics
Information Technology – LEADS 
Technology and Communication Services
Office of Special Operations – Major
Investigations
Ohio Investigative Unit
Crime Lab
Criminal Patrol
Office of Field Operations – Major
Aviation
Capitol Operations
Crash Reconstruction
Executive Protection Unit
Government Affairs
Licensing and Commercial Standards
Special Response Team
Office of Planning and Analysis – Major
Administrative Audits
Auxiliary
Central Records
Crime Laboratory
Historical Preservation Unit
Ohio Traffic Safety Office
Photographic Services
Policy Development/Accreditation 
Risk Management Unit
Special Events Unit
Statistical Analysis 
Traffic Safety/FARS

Ranks

Staffing

Troopers
The Patrol has a strength of approximately 1,600 Troopers and Enforcement Agents.

Support staff
The OSHP maintains nearly 1,000 support personnel, including load limit inspectors, motor vehicle inspectors, motor carrier enforcement inspectors, dispatchers, electronics technicians, and civilian specialists..

Auxiliary
The Patrol also maintains an all-volunteer Auxiliary which was created during World War II to supplement staffing lost to the war effort.

Police officers
The OSHP also maintains a force of State of Ohio Police Officers mostly located in the Columbus, Ohio area, who provide security police services to the Ohio Department of Transportation and the Ohio Expo Center and State Fairgrounds as well as perform security police functions at special events on state property. State of Ohio Police Officers provide general police services and enforces appropriate laws, rules, regulations, and procedures at selected state facilities. Officers assist in the apprehension and arrest of criminal violators, conduct investigations of suspicious persons and incidents, and assist the public whenever needed. Preliminary qualifications include: United States citizen, Valid driver's license, 21 years of age or older, High school diploma or G.E.D., and OPOTA Certification.

History
The Ohio State Highway Patrol was founded in 1933 under the command of Colonel Lynn Black. Originally, the Highway Patrol used solid black cars with the Flying Wheel on the door. In 1966, white cruisers made their appearance on the Ohio Turnpike. By 1972 all Ohio State Highway Patrol cruisers were white, which they remained until 1982 when they moved to sterling silver. The silver cars remained until 1991. In 1992, they moved to dark grey cruisers marked with the famous "flying wheel" insignia on the doors and a yellow stripe running the length of the car to make patrol cars more visible to motorists, in the hopes of avoiding trooper deaths related to accidents in Northern Ohio's strong winter storms. However, in 2002, the decision was made to transition the force  back to white colored patrol vehicles with larger lightbars in response to a number of incidents where troopers were killed by inattentive motorists. Marked cruisers are once again silver in color.  The emergency lighting system is now all blue with two red lights in the grille.  The Patrol utilizes a variety of vehicles, including Dodge Chargers, Ford Explorers, and Chevrolet Tahoes.  The OSHP remains to this day a highly respected organization, having gained CALEA accreditation. The state patrol  made the first state wide radio.

As of 2019, Troopers carry the SIG Sauer P320 which replaced the SIG Sauer P226 DAO (Double-Action Only) in .40 S&W, which had been in service since the early 2000s. The pistol prior to the P226 was the Beretta 96 .40 S&W pistol which is a .40 caliber version of the Beretta 92.

In the line of duty
During the history of the Patrol, 41 Troopers have died in performance of their duties.

Demographics 
The OSHP demographics are:

Male: 91%
Female: 9%
White: 86%
African-American/Black: 11%
Hispanic: 3%

Auxiliary

The Patrol Auxiliary was created in 1942 when many Troopers entered service with the United States military due to World War II. Originally, members of the Auxiliary were required to be members of the American Legion because they were previous war veterans who were unlikely to be drafted.

Today, volunteer Auxiliary members ride on patrol with Troopers, assist at crash scenes, natural disasters and emergency sites, provide highway safety displays, and patrol the Ohio State Fair.

See also

 List of law enforcement agencies in Ohio
 State police
 State patrol
 Highway patrol
 Mark Dailey – former patrolman and Canadian newscaster

References

External links
 Ohio State Highway Patrol

 
State law enforcement agencies of Ohio
Government agencies established in 1933
1933 establishments in Ohio